Whyatt is both a surname and a given name. Notable people with the name include:

Christopher Whyatt (born 1954), English cricketer
Nick Whyatt (born 1984), English ice hockey player
J. Whyatt Mondesire (1949–2015), American journalist
Whyatt Beanstalk, the alter-ego of the titular protagonist in the Canadian animated preschool television series Super Why!